Parianella is a genus of flowering plants belonging to the family Poaceae.

Its native range is Northeastern Brazil.

Species
Species:

Parianella carvalhoi 
Parianella lanceolata

References

Bambusoideae
Bambusoideae genera